Journal of Transnational American Studies is a peer-reviewed open access scholarly journal publishing original research in the field of American studies. It is published from the Department of English at the University of California, Santa Barbara. The current editor-in-chief is Nina Morgan.  The Library of Congress has selected the journal for inclusion in its permanent archive of electronic publications.

Abstracting and indexing 
The journal is abstracted and indexed in:

References

External links 
 

Creative Commons Attribution-licensed journals
Publications established in 2009
English-language journals
Cultural journals